Aura Matilde Díaz Martínez (1924-2002), better known by her artist name Matilde Díaz, was a Colombian performer of porros and boleros. She was the wife of Lucho Bermúdez, who was also known for his porros and boleros. She became the first woman to be a lead singer for a Colombian orchestra. Díaz died on 8 March 2002 from cancer in Bogota. She was posthumously inducted into the International Latin Music Hall of Fame on 10 April 2002, one month after her death.

References 

1924 births
20th-century Colombian women singers
2002 deaths
Bolero singers
Deaths from cancer in Colombia
Porro musicians
Women in Latin music